Ben Brown may refer to:

 Ben Brown (blogger) (born 1978), American blogger, publisher, and website author
 Ben Brown (cricketer) (born 1988), English cricketer
 Ben Brown (journalist) (born 1960), BBC News journalist
 Ben Brown, British kayaker in Devizes to Westminster International Canoe Marathon
 Ben Brown (playwright), British playwright
 Ben Brown (footballer) (born 1992), Australian rules footballer
 Ben Brown (musician) (born 1952), American jazz bassist
 Ben Brown, ex-bass player for Poison the Well
 Ben H. Brown Jr. (1914–1989), United States Ambassador to Liberia
 Ben Brown (baseball), baseball player
 Ben Brown (writer), New Zealand author and poet

See also
Benjamin Brown (disambiguation)